Federal Highway 160 (Carretera Federal 160) is a Federal Highway of Mexico. The highway travels from Cuernavaca, Morelos in the west to Izúcar de Matamoros, Puebla in the east. Federal Highway 160 is co-signed with Mexican Federal Highway 115 from Izúcar de Matamoros to north of Cuautla in Cuautlixco, Morelos.

References

160